Hammatoderus nitidus is a species of beetle in the family Cerambycidae. It was described by Henry Walter Bates in 1874. It is known from Nicaragua.

References

Hammatoderus
Beetles described in 1874